There are three types of business entity in Russia: private limited companies (abbreviated OOO), joint-stock companies (abbreviated ПАО; in English as JSC), which may either be public, open (OJSC) or private, closed (PJSC), and partnerships.

Private limited companies 
Private companies (Russian: Общество с ограниченной ответственностью - ООО) are by far the most popular type of legal entity in Russia. Their owners are legally responsible for their debts only to the extent of the amount of capital they invested. The minimum capital required is 10,000 Russian rubles.
Private company registration takes three business days and is performed by the Federal Tax Service. 
Private companies with annual income below 200 million Rubles and having no more than 130 employees are eligible for simplified taxation.

Joint-stock companies
There are two types of Russian joint-stock companies, public ("open") and private ("closed"). Founders of a joint-stock company sign a written agreement for its formation. This agreement establishes procedures for creating the company, such as the size of authorized capital, types and categories of shares, cost of shares, the order for settling payments, and the rights and responsibilities of the founders. This agreement then becomes the organization charter, which contains information on the name of the company, the locations of offices, the type of company (public/open (ОАО, OJSC) or private/closed (ЗАО, CJSC)), as well as other specific information on shares, capital, and so on. The company shares allotted upon founding the company must be fully paid within a year from the company's foundation unless a shorter period is required by the founding contract. However, at least half of the shares must be paid within three months, starting from the state registration of the company. Though a share which has been paid does not necessarily give voting rights to its owner.

Joint-stock companies are required to register the issue of shares with the Russian Federal Securities Market Commission (FSMC) so that shares can be traded either publicly (for an OAO) or among a limited number of people (for a PJSC). For the registration, a set of documents must be submitted to the FSMC, and the procedure usually takes 30 days to enact.

Since 1 September 2014 there have been some changes enacted in the Russian Civil Code:
 Joint-stock companies can be public and nonpublic – they are no longer called "open" and "closed", respectively. A public joint-stock company is like an OAO (shares are publicly traded). Moreover, it is important to have the word "public" in the name of the company. All companies which were JSC before, should become OOO and have to correct the type of company in their founding documents (charter).
 The statutory minimum charter capital is 5,000 Russian minimum wage rates (in 2014, the minimum wage rate was 5,554 roubles).

Open joint-stock company

An open joint-stock company (abbreviated "OJSC" in English, "ОАО" in Russian) is a legal entity where shares may be publicly traded without the permission of other shareholders. An OAO can distribute its shares to an unlimited number of shareholders and sell them without limitations. The statutory minimum charter capital is 100,000 Russian roubles.

Closed joint-stock company
A closed joint-stock company (abbreviated "CJSC" in English, "ЗАО" is Russian) is a legal entity whose shares are distributed among a limited number of shareholders – maximum 50. The statutory minimum charter capital is 10,000 Russian roubles.

State-owned corporations 
In Russia, a JSC can be completely or partially owned by the federal government. Such JSCs are different from another type of state-controlled company, the unitary enterprise (a commercial organization that operates state-owned assets). State-owned JSCs do not own or operate any state property and the state acts just like an ordinary shareholder.

Some state-owned public corporations were formerly government agencies in the Soviet Union which were reorganized into completely state-owned JSCs in 1992–1993 to undergo a transition to a fully independent business. The management and the board of directors in such state-owned corporations were appointed by the Council of Ministers/the government and included top government officials and ministers. The largest of such corporations were initially incorporated as Russian joint-stock companies (abbreviated as RAO). Best known examples were RAO UES and RAO Gazprom. But they have since been converted to public JSCs (OAO), even though their shares remain the property of the government.

Less important JSCs, or the JSCs only partially owned by the government, are managed through the Federal Agency for State Property Management (Rosimushchestvo).

Disadvantages
While a joint-stock company presents several advantages compared to a typical business establishment, the burden of creating a JSC typically outweighs that of a private limited company. This is especially true in Russia where the abnormally excessive legal and bureaucratic challenges facing prospective entrepreneurs typically dissuade most from starting a JSC. Without the need to issue shares in a private limited company, it makes private limited companies much more flexible when the need arises for members to change the charter capital of the company. Furthermore, a private limited company can collectively or individually hold at least a 10% interest in the company's charter capital, and it does not have the power to request a court expel another participant. All of this is not possible in a joint-stock company, or prohibitively difficult.

Partnerships

References

Types of business entity
Economy of Russia
Privatization in Russia